District of Peć (UNMIK/Kosovo)
Peć District (Serbia)

District name disambiguation pages